Management Information Format (MIF file) is a format used to describe a hardware or software component. MIF files are used by DMI to report system configuration information. Although MIF is a system-independent format, it is used primarily by Windows systems. To install a new device in a Windows 95 system, the corresponding MIF file is needed.

References

Windows administration
Computer file formats